The 2017 Badminton Asia Championships was the 36th edition of the Badminton Asia Championships. It was held in Wuhan, China, from April 25 to April 30.

Venue
This tournament was held at Wuhan Sports Center Gymnasium.

Medal summary

Medalists

Medal table

Men's singles

Seeds

  Lee Chong Wei (semifinals)
  Chen Long (champion)
  Son Wan-ho (quarterfinals)
  Lin Dan (final)
  Tian Houwei (first round)
  Shi Yuqi (semifinals)
  Chou Tien-chen (quarterfinals)
  Ng Ka Long Angus (quarterfinals)

Top half

Bottom half

Finals

Women's singles

Seeds

  Tai Tzu-ying (champion)
  Akane Yamaguchi (final)
  Sung Ji-hyun (second round)
  P. V. Sindhu (quarterfinals)
  Sun Yu (second round)
  Ratchanok Intanon (quarterfinals)
  Saina Nehwal (first round)
  He Bingjiao (semifinals)

Top half

Bottom half

Finals

Men's doubles

Seeds

  Marcus Fernaldi Gideon / Kevin Sanjaya Sukamuljo (withdrew)
  Goh V Shem / Tan Wee Kiong (second round)
  Chai Biao / Hong Wei (semifinals)
  Takeshi Kamura / Keigo Sonoda (semifinals)
  Fu Haifeng / Zhang Nan (quarterfinals)
  Li Junhui / Liu Yuchen (champion)
  Angga Pratama / Ricky Karanda Suwardi (second round)
  Lee Jhe-huei / Lee Yang (first round)

Top half

Bottom half

Finals

Women's doubles

Seeds

  Misaki Matsutomo / Ayaka Takahashi (champion)
  Jung Kyung-eun / Shin Seung-chan (quarterfinals)
  Chang Ye-na / Lee So-hee (semifinals)
  Chen Qingchen / Jia Yifan (quarterfinals)
  Luo Ying / Luo Yu (quarterfinals)
  Naoko Fukuman / Kurumi Yonao (first round)
  Puttita Supajirakul / Sapsiree Taerattanachai (first round)
  Jongkolphan Kititharakul / Rawinda Prajongjai (second round)

Top half

Bottom half

Finals

Mixed doubles

Seeds

  Zheng Siwei / Chen Qingchen (quarterfinals)
  Tontowi Ahmad / Liliyana Natsir (withdrew)
  Lu Kai / Huang Yaqiong (champion)
  Chan Peng Soon / Goh Liu Ying (withdrew)
  Praveen Jordan / Debby Susanto (quarterfinals)
  Tan Kian Meng / Lai Pei Jing (quarterfinals)
  Zhang Nan / Li Yinhui (quarterfinals)
  Dechapol Puavaranukroh / Sapsiree Taerattanachai (final)

Top half

Bottom half

Finals

References

External links
Badminton Asia Championships 2017

Badminton Asia Championships
Asian Badminton Championships
Badminton tournaments in China
International sports competitions hosted by China
2017 in Chinese sport
Sport in Wuhan